The 1980 Island Holidays Classic, also known as the Hawaii Open, was a men's tennis tournament played an outdoor hard courts in Maui, Hawaii, in the United States that was part of the 1980 Volvo Grand Prix circuit. It was the seventh edition of the tournament and was held from September 29 through October 5, 1980. Fourth-seeded Eliot Teltscher won the singles title.

Finals

Singles
 Eliot Teltscher defeated  Tim Wilkison 7–6, 6–3
 It was Teltscher's 2nd singles title of the year and the 4th of his career.

Doubles
 John McEnroe /  Peter Fleming defeated  Victor Amaya /  Hank Pfister 7–6, 6–7, 6–2

References

Island Holidays Classic
Island Holidays Classic
Island Holidays Classic
Island Holidays Classic
Island Holidays Classic
Hawaii Open